2015 in Bellator MMA was the seventh year in the history of Bellator MMA, a mixed martial arts promotion based in the United States. Bellator held 16 events in 2015.

Background
In June 2014, Founder and CEO Bjorn Rebney parted with the company. Former Strikeforce founder Scott Coker was announced as the new President of Bellator MMA. Beginning this year, Bellator would drop its original, weekly, seasonal tournament format and adopt a traditional monthly schedule.

2015 would also see a collaboration between Bellator and kickboxing promotion Glory, both of which aired fight cards on Spike TV. Announced in June, Bellator MMA & Glory: Dynamite 1 (or Bellator 142: Dynamite 1) was broadcast live on September 19.

Bellator 132

Bellator 132: Pitbull vs. Straus 2 took place January 16, 2015 at Pechanga Resort & Casino in Temecula, California.  The event aired live in prime time on Spike TV.

Background

A Bellator Featherweight World Championship rematch between Patrício Pitbull and Daniel Straus headlined the event. The two originally met in a closely contested fight at Bellator 45 on May 21, 2011, with Pitbull winning the bout via unanimous decision.

Results

|-
! colspan="8" style="background-color: #ccf; color: #000080; text-align: center;" | Preliminary Card (Spike.com)
|-

Bellator 133

Bellator 133: Shlemenko vs. Manhoef took place February 13, 2015 at Save Mart Center in Fresno, California. The event aired live in prime time on Spike TV.

Background

This event was headlined with a bout between former Bellator Middleweight Champion Alexander Shlemenko and Melvin Manhoef.

Results

|-
! colspan="8" style="background-color: #ccf; color: #000080; text-align: center;" | Preliminary Card (Spike.com)
|-

|-
! colspan="8" style="background-color: #ccf; color: #000080; text-align: center;" | Postliminary Card (Dark Bouts)
|-

Bellator 134

Bellator 134: Newton vs. McGeary took place February 27, 2015 at the Mohegan Sun Arena in Uncasville, Connecticut.  The event aired live during prime time on Spike TV, and was followed up with an encore of the entire event.

Background

The main card of Bellator 134 was announced on the air during Bellator 131.  President Scott Coker announced the main card fights would feature fighters representing the United States taking on fighters representing the United Kingdom.

The event was headlined by a Light Heavyweight Championship match between current champion Emanuel Newton and Bellator 2014 Summer Series Light Heavyweight Tournament Winner Liam McGeary.

Douglas Lima was originally scheduled to defend his Welterweight title against Paul Daley on this card.  However, in early January 2015, he pulled out of the bout due to an injury.

Michael Page was expected to face Curtis Millender but withdrew due to a cut over his left eye and was replaced by Brennan Ward. As a result of the move, Ward's original opponent, Jesse Juarez, was pulled from the card altogether.

Results

|-
! colspan="8" style="background-color: #ccf; color: #000080; text-align: center;" | Preliminary Card (Spike.com)
|-

Bellator 135

Bellator 135: Warren vs. Galvao 2 took March 27, 2015 at WinStar World Casino in Thackerville, Oklahoma. The event aired live in prime time on Spike TV.

Background

This event headlined the Bellator Bantamweight Championship between champion Joe Warren and challenger Marcos Galvao.

Mike Richman was expected to face Eduardo Dantas but forced out by injury.  As a result, L.C. Davis vs. Hideo Tokoro elevated to the co-main event.

Results

|-
! colspan="8" style="background-color: #ccf; color: #000080; text-align: center;" | Preliminary Card (Spike.com)
|-

Bellator 136

Bellator 136: Brooks vs. Jansen took place on April 10, 2015 at Bren Events Center in Irvine, California. The event aired live in prime time on Spike TV.

Background

This event was headlined by Lightweight Championship match between current champion Will Brooks and Season 7 Lightweight Tournament Winner Dave Jansen.

The co-main event was a middleweight fight between longtime kickboxer Joe Schilling and Rafael Carvalho.

Results

|-
! colspan="8" style="background-color: #ccf; color: #000080; text-align: center;" | Preliminary Card (Spike.com)
|-

|-
! colspan="8" style="background-color: #ccf; color: #000080; text-align: center;" | Postliminary Card (Dark Bouts)
|-

Bellator 137

Bellator 137: Halsey vs. Grove took place May 15, 2015 at the Pechanga Resort and Casino in Temecula, California. The event aired live in prime time on Spike TV.

Background

The event was expected to be headlined by a Bellator Middleweight Championship bout between then champion Brandon Halsey and UFC veteran Kendall Grove. However, Halsey came in overweight at the weigh-ins, weighing in at 188.1 lb. This prompted Bellator to create a stipulation that if Halsey won the bout, the championship would be vacated. If Grove won the bout, he would become the undisputed champion.

The co-main event featured a Bellator Bantamweight Championship title eliminator bout between former champion Eduardo Dantas and Mike Richman.  This bout was briefly in jeopardy as Richman missed weight and Dantas agreed for the fight to continue under the condition that Richman wouldn't weight more than 147 pounds on fight night, but Richman declined.  However, both fighters' camps agreed to new stipulations the day of the fight.

A.J. Matthews was expected to face Ben Reiter at the event. However, Matthews was forced out of the bout and was replaced by Strikeforce and UFC veteran Benji Radach.

Results

|-
! colspan="8" style="background-color: #ccf; color: #000080; text-align: center;" | Preliminary Card (Spike.com)
|-

|-
! colspan="8" style="background-color: #ccf; color: #000080; text-align: center;" | Postliminary Card (Dark Bouts)
|-

Bellator 138

Bellator 138: Unfinished Business took place on June 19, 2015 at the Scottrade Center in St. Louis, Missouri and was broadcast live in prime time on Spike TV, attracting an average 1.7 million viewers.

Background

The event was headlined by a heavyweight bout between combat sports veterans Kimbo Slice and Ken Shamrock. The two were originally expected to fight on October 4, 2008 at the BankAtlantic Center in Sunrise, Florida as part of CBS' Saturday Night Fights at EliteXC: Heat. However, Shamrock received a cut to the left eye during a warm-up only hours before the fight was to take place. That bout was eventually rescheduled for this event.

The co-main event was originally expected to feature a Bellator Featherweight Championship bout between current champion Patrício Freire and former WSOF Featherweight champion Georgi Karakhanyan. However, Karakhanyan was forced out of the bout due to an injury and was replaced by Season 10 Featherweight Tournament winner Daniel Weichel.	

Bobby Lashley was originally scheduled to face James Thompson at this event. However, on June 10, it was announced that Thompson pulled out of the bout due to injury and was replaced by Dan Charles.

Bellator 138 was the highest rated Bellator event to date before Bellator 149. It did an average of 1.6 million viewers for the whole event and a peak of 2.4 million during the Kimbo Slice and Ken Shamrock fight with a DVR peak of 2.9 million. The previous high was Bellator 131 which did 1.2 million average for the entire event and a peak of 2 million during the Tito Ortiz and Stephan Bonnar fight and a DVR peak of 2.2 million.

Results

|-

|-
! colspan="8" style="background-color: #ccf; color: #000080; text-align: center;" | Preliminary Card (Spike.com)
|-

|-
! colspan="8" style="background-color: #ccf; color: #000080; text-align: center;" | Postliminary Card (Dark Bouts)
|-

Bellator 139

Bellator 139: Kongo vs. Volkov took place June 26, 2015 at Kansas Star Casino in Mulvane, Kansas. The event aired live in prime time on Spike TV.

Background

This event was headlined by a heavyweight bout between UFC veteran Cheick Kongo and former Bellator Heavyweight Champion Alexander Volkov. It was also Hisaki Kato's Bellator Debut.
 	
Results

|-
! colspan="8" style="background-color: #ccf; color: #000080; text-align: center;" | Preliminary Card (Spike.com)
|-

|-
! colspan="8" style="background-color: #ccf; color: #000080; text-align: center;" | Postliminary Card (Dark Bouts)
|-

Bellator 140

Bellator 140: Lima vs. Koreshkov took place July 17, 2015 at Mohegan Sun Arena in Uncasville, Connecticut.  The event aired live in prime time on Spike TV.

Background

This event was headlined by a Welterweight Championship fight between current champion Douglas Lima and two-time tournament winner Andrey Koreshkov.

Results

|-
! colspan="8" style="background-color: #ccf; color: #000080; text-align: center;" | Preliminary Card (Spike.com)
|-

Bellator 141

Bellator 141: Guillard vs. Girtz took place August 28, 2015 at the Pechanga Resort and Casino in Temecula, California. The event aired live in prime time on Spike TV.

Background

The event was headlined by a lightweight bout between debuting UFC veteran Melvin Guillard and Bellator MMA veteran Brandon Girtz.

Results

Bellator 142

Bellator 143

Bellator 143: Warren vs. Davis took place on September 25, 2015 at the State Farm Arena in Hidalgo, Texas. The event aired live in prime time on Spike TV.

Background

The event was headlined by a bantamweight bout between former Bellator Bantamweight champion Joe Warren and WEC veteran LC Davis.

Ryan Couture was scheduled to face Nick Gonzalez on this card.  However, Gonzalez weighed in at 172.75 pounds, over sixteen pounds past the lightweight limit, and the fight was cancelled.

Results

Bellator 144

Bellator 144: Halsey  vs. Carvalho took place October 23, 2015 at the Mohegan Sun Arena in Uncasville, Connecticut. The event aired live in prime time on Spike TV.

Background

The main event  featured a vacant Bellator Middleweight Championship bout between undefeated former champion Brandon Halsey and top contender Rafael Carvalho.

Results

Bellator 145

Bellator 145: Vengeance took place November 6, 2015 at the Scottrade Center in St. Louis, Missouri. The event aired live in prime time on Spike TV.

Background

The event was headlined by a Featherweight Championship trilogy fight between current champion Patrício Freire and former champion Daniel Mason-Straus.

The co-main event featured a Lightweight Championship fight between current champion Will Brooks and Season 10 Lightweight Tournament winner Marcin Held.

Michael Chandler rematched David Rickels, whom he knocked out at Bellator 97 in July 2013. Bobby Lashley looked to avenge a contentious May 2012 Super Fight League decision loss to James Thompson.

Results

Bellator 146

Bellator 146: Kato vs. Manhoef took place November 20, 2015 at the WinStar World Casino in Thackerville, Oklahoma. The event aired live in prime time on Spike TV.

Background

The event was headlined by a middleweight bout between Hisaki Kato and Strikeforce veteran Melvin Manhoef.

Results

Bellator 147

Bellator 147: Thomson vs. Villaseca took place December 4, 2015 at San Jose State University in San Jose, California. The event aired live in prime time on Spike TV.

Results

References

External links
Bellator

2015 in mixed martial arts
Bellator MMA events